Darryl Preston is a British Conservative Party politician and former police officer, who currently serves as the Cambridgeshire Police and Crime Commissioner.

Career
Preston joined the Metropolitan Police in 1983, before transferring in 1998 to the Cambridgeshire Constabulary, where he served until retirement in 2017. He then became a senior official of the Association of Police and Crime Commissioners.

Police and Crime Commissioner
Preston was elected as the Police and Crime Commissioner for Cambridgeshire in 2021.

References

Year of birth missing (living people)
Living people
Metropolitan Police officers
Officers in English police forces
Police and crime commissioners in England
Conservative Party police and crime commissioners
Place of birth missing (living people)